Stephanus Frederick Grobler (born 11 November 1982) is a South African former cricketer who played for Gauteng, Boland and South Western Districts. A right-handed batsman and right-arm off break bowler, he played 30 first-class matches between 2006 and 2011.

Grobler also played club cricket in the Leicestershire Premier League with Thorpe Arnold and Narborough & Littlethorpe.

He made his Twenty20 cricket debut for Munster Reds in the 2017 Inter-Provincial Trophy on 26 May 2017.

References

External links

1982 births
Living people
Cricketers from Pretoria
South African cricketers
Gauteng cricketers
Boland cricketers
South Western Districts cricketers
Munster Reds cricketers